Tomáš Harkabus (born March 16, 1994) is a Czech professional ice hockey forward playing for HC Dukla Jihlava of the Chance Liga.

Harkabus previously played 47 games in the Czech Extraliga for HC Karlovy Vary. He also played on loan with SK Kadaň, HC Frýdek-Místek and HC Baník Sokolov as well as three loan spells with Dukla Jihlava before joining the team permanently on May 22, 2018.

References

External links

1994 births
Living people
HC Baník Sokolov players
Czech ice hockey forwards
HC Dukla Jihlava players
HC Frýdek-Místek players
HC Karlovy Vary players
Sportovní Klub Kadaň players
Sportspeople from Ústí nad Labem